School District 104 may refer to:
 Central School District 104
 Summit School School District 104
 Satsop School District 104